Year 1555 (MDLV) was a common year starting on Tuesday (link will display the full calendar) of the Julian calendar.

Events 
 January–June 
 January 22 – The Kingdom of Ava in Upper Burma falls.
 February 2 – The Diet of Augsburg begins.
 February 4 – John Rogers suffers death by burning at the stake at Smithfield, London, the first of the Protestant martyrs of the English Reformation under Mary I of England.
 February 8 – Laurence Saunders becomes the second of the Marian Protestant martyrs in England, being led barefoot to his death by burning at the stake in Coventry.
 February 9 – Rowland Taylor, Rector of Hadleigh, Suffolk, and John Hooper, deposed Bishop of Gloucester, are burned at the stake in England.
 April 10 –  Pope Marcellus II succeeds Julius III as the 222nd pope. He will reign for 22 days.
 April 17 – After 18 months of siege, the Republic of Siena surrenders to the Florentine–Imperial army.
 May 23 – Pope Paul IV succeeds Marcellus II, as the 223rd pope.
 May 25 – Jeanne d'Albret succeeds Henri II on the Navarrese throne.
 June 1 – The Treaty of Amasya between the Ottoman Empire and Safavid Persia concludes the Ottoman–Safavid War (1532–1555).

 July–December 
 July 12 – Pope Paul IV creates the Roman Ghetto, the first Jewish ghetto in Rome.
 September 25 – The Peace of Augsburg is signed between Charles V, Holy Roman Emperor, and the Lutheran Schmalkaldic League, establishing the principle Cuius regio, eius religio, that is, rulers within the Empire can choose the religion of their realm.
 September – The 1555 Kashmir earthquake causes widespread destruction and death in Kashmir, India.
 October 16
  Battle of Miyajima Island: Mori Motonari defeats Sue Harukata.
 Two of the Oxford Martyrs, Hugh Latimer and Nicholas Ridley, are burned at the stake in England.
 October 25 – Charles V abdicates as Holy Roman Emperor and is succeeded by his brother Ferdinand.

 Date unknown 
 Russia breaks a 60-year-old truce with Sweden by attacking Finland.
 Humayun resumes rule of the Mughal Empire.
 Second Battle of Panipat: Bairam Khan defeats Hindu forces.
 The Adal Sultanate in the Horn of Africa collapses.
 The Muscovy Company is chartered in England to trade with Muscovy and Richard Chancellor negotiates with the Tsar.
 English captain John Lok returns from Guinea, with five Africans to train as interpreters for future trading voyages.
 Richard Eden publishes The Decades of the Newe Worlde or West India, a translation into English of parts of Pietro Martire d'Anghiera's De orbe novo decades, the Gonzalo Fernández de Oviedo y Valdés work Natural hystoria de las Indias and others, urging his countrymen to follow the lead of Spain in exploring the New World; the work includes the first recorded use in English of the country name 'China'.
 Establishment in England of the following grammar schools: Boston Grammar School, Gresham's School at Holt, Norfolk (founded by Sir John Gresham) and Ripon Grammar School (re-foundation).
 William Annyas becomes the Mayor of Youghal, Ireland, the first Jew to hold such a position in Ireland.
 John Dee is charged, but cleared, of treason in England.
 Orlande de Lassus' first book of madrigals is published, in Antwerp.
 Lorenzo de' Medici orders a violin from Andrea Amati of Cremona.

Births 

 January 26 – Charles II, Lord of Monaco (d. 1589)
 February 25 – Alonso Lobo, Spanish musician (d. 1617)
 March 18 – François, Duke of Anjou, youngest son of Henry II of France and Catherine de' Medici (d. 1584)
 March 21 – John Leveson, English politician (d. 1615)
 March 31 – Elizabeth Stuart, Countess of Lennox, English countess (d. 1582)
 April 21 – Ludovico Carracci, Italian painter (d. 1619)
 April 28 – Karl Friedrich of Jülich-Cleves-Berg, heir apparent of Jülich-Cleves-Berg (d. 1575)
 May 5 – Queen Uiin, Korean royal consort (d. 1600)
 May 9 – Jerónima de la Asunción, founder of the first Catholic monastery in Manila, the Monastery of Santa Clara (d. 1630)
 May 29 – George Carew, 1st Earl of Totnes, English earl, general and administrator (d. 1629)
 June 11 – Lodovico Zacconi, Italian composer and music theorist (d. 1627)
 June 13 – Giovanni Antonio Magini, Italian mathematician, cartographer and astronomer (d. 1617)
 June 16 – Duke Otto Henry of Brunswick-Harburg, Hereditary Prince of Brunswick-Lüneburg-Harburg (d. 1591)
 July – Henry Garnet, English Jesuit (d. 1606)
 July 6 – Louis II, Cardinal of Guise, French Catholic cardinal (d. 1588)
 July 17 – Richard Carew, English scholar (d. 1620)
 August 1 – Edward Kelley, English spirit medium (d. 1597)
 September 3 – Jan Zbigniew Ossoliński, Polish nobleman (d. 1628)
 September 21 – John Thynne, English landowner and politician (d. 1604)
 September 23 – Louise de Coligny, princess consort of Orange (d. 1620)
 September 28 – Henri de La Tour d'Auvergne, vicomte de Turenne, duc de Bouillon, Marshal of France (d. 1623)
 October 6 – Ferenc Nádasdy, Hungarian noble (d. 1604)
 October 12 – Peregrine Bertie, 13th Baron Willoughby de Eresby, English baron (d. 1601)
 November 8 – Nyaungyan Min, king of Burma (d. 1605)
 December 4 – Heinrich Meibom, German historian and poet (d. 1625)
 December 27 – Johann Arndt, German Lutheran theologian (d. 1621)
 date unknown
 Lancelot Andrewes, English clergyman and scholar (d. 1626)
 Adam Sędziwój Czarnkowski, Polish nobleman (d. 1628)
 Samuel Eidels, Polish Jewish rabbi and Talmudist (d. 1631)
 Joshua Falk, Polish Jewish rabbi and commentator (d. 1614)
 Elijah Loans, German Jewish rabbi and kabbalist (d. 1636)
 François de Malherbe, French poet (d. 1628)
 Okudaira Sadamasa, Japanese nobleman (d. 1615)
 Konishi Yukinaga, Japanese Christian daimyō (d. 1600)
 Moderata Fonte, Italian poet, writer and philosopher (d. 1592)
 Maria van Schooten, Dutch war heroine (d. 1573)
 Naresuan, King of Ayutthaya (d. 1605)

Deaths 

 January 14 – Jacques Dubois, French anatomist (b. 1478)
 February 4 – John Rogers, English clergyman (burned at the stake) (b. c. 1505)
 February 8 – Laurence Saunders, English clergyman (burned at the stake) (b. 1519)
 February 9
 Christian Egenolff, German printer (b. 1502)
 John Hooper, English churchman (burned at the stake) (b. c. 1497)
 Rowland Taylor, English Protestant martyr (burned at the stake) (b. 1510)
 February 17 – Giuliano Bugiardini, Italian painter (b. 1475)
 March 14 – John Russell, 1st Earl of Bedford (b. 1485)
 March 23 – Pope Julius III (b. 1487)
 March 27 – Al-Mutawakkil Yahya Sharaf ad-Din, Imam of the Zaidi state in Yemen (b. 1473)
 April 12 – Queen Joanna of Castile, long under confinement (b. 1479)
 April 18 – Polydore Vergil, English historian (b. 1470)
 May 1 – Pope Marcellus II (b. 1501)
 May 21 – George III, Landgrave of Leuchtenberg (b. 1502)
 May 25
 Gemma Frisius, Dutch mathematician and cartographer (b. 1508)
 Henry II of Navarre (b. 1503)
 June 10 – Elizabeth of Denmark, Electress of Brandenburg (1502–1535) (b. 1485)
 September 8 – Thomas of Villanova, Spanish Roman Catholic bishop and saint (b. 1488)
 October 5 – Edward Wotton, English zoologist (b. 1492)
 October 9 – Justus Jonas, German Protestant reformer (b. 1493)
 October 16
 Hugh Latimer, English clergyman (burned at the stake) (b. c. 1487)
 Nicholas Ridley, English clergyman (burned at the stake)
 Sue Harukata, Japanese retainer under the Ouchi clan (b. 1521)
 October 26 – Olympia Fulvia Morata, Italian classical scholar (b. 1526)
 November 4 – Agnes of Hesse, German nobleman, by marriage, Princess of Saxony (b. 1527)
 November 12
 Stephen Gardiner, English bishop and Lord Chancellor (b. 1493)
 Yang Jisheng, Ming Chinese statesman (beheaded) (b. 1516) 
 Zhang Jing, Ming Chinese general (beheaded)
 November 21 – Georgius Agricola, German scientist (b. 1490)
 December – Stanisław Kostka, Polish noble (b. 1487)
 December 9 – Elisabeth of Culemborg, German noble (b. 1475)

References